Hradište pod Vrátnom is a village and municipality in Senica District in the Trnava Region of western Slovakia.

History
In historical records the village was first mentioned in 1262.

Geography
The municipality lies at an altitude of 284 metres and covers an area of 25.195 km2. It has a population of about 701 people.

Genealogical resources

The records for genealogical research are available at the state archive "Statny Archiv in Bratislava, Slovakia"

 Roman Catholic church records (births/marriages/deaths): 1709-1958 (parish A)

See also
 List of municipalities and towns in Slovakia

References

External links

Surnames of living people in Hradiste pod Vratnom

Villages and municipalities in Senica District